Il Covile (Italian: The Lair) is an Italian online magazine published in Italy.

Profile
Edited by Stefano Borselli, the magazine was founded in September 2009, and its cultural line draws on Carl Schmitt’s “Catholical form”, on contemporary conservative thought (MacIntyre, Scruton) and on marxism of the second half of the twentieth-century (Cesarano, Camatte, Debord, Tronti). Outstanding features are the typographic qualities: William Morris’ font and Igino Marini’s Fell types are used for the heading and the text type, while the pages are usually decorated with vignette from Baroque era editions.

Contents
Many topics are covered, from architecture and planning (with the endorsement of the views of Christopher Alexander, Léon Krier, Nikos Salingaros), to critics of Contemporary art (Jean Clair, Marc Fumaroli, Aude De Kerros), to the choice of the rhymed verses, to the male identity (criticism of feminism and Gender Theory), to the Judaic and Christian roots of the occidental civilization. All themes are linked through the fil rouge of the opposition to the nihilist drift of modernity in the name of the Christian Epimetheus evoked by Konrad Weiß, Carl Schmitt and Ivan Illich. Il Covile also treats material culture, crafts and typography.

Editorial Staff
Francesco Borselli, Riccardo De Benedetti, Aude de Kerros, Pietro De Marco, Armando Ermini, Luciano Funari, Giuseppe Ghini, Ciro Lomonte, Roberto Manfredini, Ettore Maria Mazzola, Alzek Misheff, Pietro Pagliardini, Almanacco romano, Gabriella Rouf, Nikos Salingaros, Andrea Sciffo, Stefano Serafini, Stefano Silvestri, Massimo Zaratin.

See also
 List of magazines in Italy

References

External links

2009 establishments in Italy
Cultural magazines
Italian-language magazines
Italian websites
Magazines established in 2009
Magazines published in Florence
Online magazines